Glenford "Gee" Spencer (born 1975 in St Catherine) is a Jamaican criminal and member of the Yardies who was listed as one of the top ten most wanted criminals in the country by the Jamaica Constabulary Force.

Background
Spencer fled Jamaica after being charged with the murder of Rohan Lowers and, in 2002, was spotted in Bristol, England.

In 2001, he was listed on a Most Wanted list, at place number five.

See also 
List of fugitives from justice who disappeared

References

1975 births
Fugitives wanted by Jamaica
Living people
People from Saint Catherine Parish
Yardies
People charged with murder